The 1994 European Parliament election in Portugal was the election of MEP representing Portugal constituency for the 1994-1999 term of the European Parliament. It was part of the wider 1994 European election. In Portugal the election was held on 12 June.

In the closest nationwide election in Portuguese history, the Socialist Party (PS) polled just less than 0.5% ahead of the Social Democrats (PSD). Nonetheless, it was a very strong performance from the Socialists, as they gained 6% more than in 1989, and also won 2 more MEP. It was also the first nationwide election victory for the PS since the 1983 general elections. At that time, the PSD was in government for almost 9 years, but the party suffered little wear. The Social Democrats won 34.4% of the votes, a gain of more than 1.5% compared with 1989, and were able to hold on to the 9 seats they won in 1989.

The People's Party (CDS–PP), although losing some ground, was able to win back 3rd place with a very nationalist and anti-Europe speech. The CDS–PP won 12.5% of the votes, a drop of almost 2%, but maintained their 3 seats. The Democratic Unity Coalition (CDU) had a very poor performance, falling to 4th place, and losing both share of vote and seats. The Communist/Green alliance won just 11% of the votes, a drop of 3%, and lost one seat from the Ecologist Party "The Greens".

Turnout fell to all-time low levels, with just 35.5% of voters casting a ballot.

Electoral system
The voting method used, for the election of European members of parliament, is by proportional representation using the d'Hondt method, which is known to benefit leading parties. In the 1994 EU elections, Portugal had 25 seats to be filled. Deputies are elected in a single constituency, corresponding to the entire national territory.

Parties and candidates
The major parties that partook in the election, and their EP list leaders, were:

Democratic Unity Coalition (CDU), Luís Manuel de Sá
Socialist Party (PS), António Vitorino
Social Democratic Party (PSD), Eurico de Melo
People's Party (CDS–PP), Manuel Monteiro

Opinion polling

The following table shows the opinion polls of voting intention of the Portuguese voters before the election. Those parties that are listed were represented in the EU parliament (1989-1994). Included is also the result of the Portuguese EP elections in 1989 and 1994 for reference.

Note, until 2000, the publication of opinion polls in the last week of the campaign was forbidden.

National summary of votes and seats

|-
! style="background-color:#E9E9E9;text-align:left;" colspan=2 |National party
! style="background-color:#E9E9E9;text-align:left;" |Europeanparty
! style="background-color:#E9E9E9;text-align:left;" |Main candidate
! style="background-color:#E9E9E9;text-align:right;" |Votes
! style="background-color:#E9E9E9;text-align:right;" |%
! style="background-color:#E9E9E9;text-align:right;" |+/–
! style="background-color:#E9E9E9;text-align:right;" |Seats
! style="background-color:#E9E9E9;text-align:right;" |+/–
|- style="text-align:right;"
| style="background-color: " width=5px|
| style="text-align:left;" | Socialist Party (PS)
| style="text-align:left;" | PES
| style="text-align:left;" | António Vitorino
| 1,061,560	
| 34.87	
| 6.33 
! 10
| 2 
|- style="text-align:right;"
| style="background-color: " width=5px|
| style="text-align:left;" | Social Democratic Party (PSD)
| style="text-align:left;" | EPP
| style="text-align:left;" | Eurico de Melo
| 1,046,918
| 34.39	
| 1.64 
! 9
| 0 
|- style="text-align:right;"
| style="background-color: " width=5px|
| style="text-align:left;" | People's Party (CDS–PP)
| style="text-align:left;" | EDA
| style="text-align:left;" | Manuel Monteiro
| 379,044	
| 12.45	
| 1.71 
! 3
| 0 
|- style="text-align:right;"
| style="background-color: " width=5px|
| style="text-align:left;vertical-align:top;" | Democratic Unitarian Coalition (CDU) • Communist Party (PCP)• Ecologist Party (PEV)
| style="text-align:left;vertical-align:top;" | GUE/NGL
| style="text-align:left;vertical-align:top;" | Luis Manuel de Sá
| style="vertical-align:top;" | 340,725
| style="vertical-align:top;" | 11.19
| style="vertical-align:top;" | 3.21 
! 330
| 0 1 
|- align="right"
| style="background-color: " width=5px|
| style="text-align:left;" | Workers' Communist Party (PCTP/MRPP)
| style="text-align:left;" | None
| style="text-align:left;" | António Garcia Pereira
| 24,022
| 0.79
| 0.15 
! 0
| 0 
|- align="right"
| style="background-color:#E2062C" width=5px|
| style="text-align:left;" | People's Democratic Union (UDP)
| style="text-align:left;" | None
| style="text-align:left;" | Carlos Marques
| 18,884
| 0.62
| 0.46 
! 0
| 0 
|- align="right"
| style="background-color:red" width=5px|
| style="text-align:left;" | Revolutionary Socialist Party (PSR)
| style="text-align:left;" | None
| style="text-align:left;" | -
| 17,780
| 0.59
| 0.19 
! 0
| 0 
|- style="text-align:right;"
| style="background-color: " width=5px|
| align="left"| Earth Party (MPT)
| align="left"| ALDE
| align="left"| -
| 12,955
| 0.43
| new
! 0
| new
|- style="text-align:right;"
| style="background-color:purple" width=5px|
| align="left"| Politics XXI (PXXI)
| align="left"| None
| align="left"| -
| 12,402
| 0.41
| new
! 0
| new
|- align="right"
| style="background-color:#000080" width=5px|
| align="left"| National Solidarity Party (PSN)
| align="left"| None 
| align="left"| -
| 11,214 
| 0.37
| new
! 0
| new
|- align="right"
| style="background-color: " width=5px|
| align="left"| People's Monarchist Party (PPM)
| align="left"| None
| align="left"| -
| 8,300
| 0.27
| 1.79 
! 0
| 0 
|- align="right"
| style="background-color: " width=5px|
| align="left"| Democratic Party of the Atlantic (PDA)
| align="left"| None
| align="left"| -
| 7,127
| 0.23
| new
! 0
| new
|- style="text-align:right;"
| style="background-color: green" width=5px|
| style="text-align:left;" | Democratic Renewal Party (PRD)
| style="text-align:left;" | RBW
| style="text-align:left;" | Manuel Vargas Loureiro
| 5,941 	
| 0.20
| new
! 0
| new
|- align="right"
| style="background-color: " width=5px|
| align="left"| Unity Movement for Workers (MUD)
| align="left"| None
| align="left"| Carmelinda Pereira
| 2,893
| 0.10
| 0.17 
! 0
| 0 
|- align="right"
|- style="background-color:#E9E9E9"
| style="text-align:right;" colspan="4" | Valid votes
| 2,949,765
| 96.90
| colspan="3" rowspan="2" | 
|- style="background-color:#E9E9E9"
| style="text-align:right;" colspan="4" | Blank and invalid votes
| 94,236
| 3.10
|- style="background-color:#E9E9E9"
| style="text-align:right;" colspan="4" | Totals
| 3,044,001
| 100.00
| —
! style="background-color:#E9E9E9"|25
| 1 
|- style="background-color:#E9E9E9"
| colspan="4" | Electorate (eligible voters) and voter turnout
| 8,565,822
| 35.54
| 15.56 
| colspan="2"| 
|-
| style="text-align:left;" colspan="11" | Source: Comissão Nacional de Eleições
|}

Distribution by European group

Maps

See also
Politics of Portugal
List of political parties in Portugal
Elections in Portugal
European Parliament

References

External links
Results according to the Portuguese Electoral Commission of the 12 June 1994 election of the 25 delegates from Portugal to the European Parliament

Portugal
European Parliament elections in Portugal
1994 elections in Portugal